Abdulrahman Najr Al-Harbi (born 3 January 1992) is a Saudi Arabian professional footballer who plays as a winger for Al-Helaliah.

Career
Al-Harbi started his career at Al-Taawon and is a product of the Al-Taawoun's youth system. On 13 September 2013, Al-Harbi made his professional debut for Al-Taawoun against Najran in the Pro League, replacing Vinícius Reche . He then played with Al-Asyah, and Al-Badaya.

Career statistics

Club

References

External links 
 

1992 births
Living people
Saudi Arabian footballers
Al-Taawoun FC players
Al-Asyah Club players
Al-Badaya Club players
Al-Helaliah Club players
Saudi Professional League players
Saudi Second Division players
Saudi Fourth Division players
Association football wingers